Miguel Alberto Rojas Lasso  (born 5 March 1977) is a retired Colombian international footballer.

Career
Born in Aipe, Huila Department, Rojas began playing football with local side Atlético Huila. He made his professional debut in 1999 and would stay at the club until 2003. He moved to Once Caldas, where he would win the Colombian championship as well as the Copa Libertadores 2004. A brief spell with Chicó F.C. followed before a return to Once Caldas. Next, Rojas moved to Club Deportivo Los Millonarios.

In February 2010, Rojas signed for Colombian second division side Alianza Petrolera.

In 2005, Rojas represented the Colombia national football team for his first and only time, entering as a second-half substitute in a friendly against Guatemala played in Los Angeles.

Titles

References

External links

Profile at BDFA

1977 births
Living people
Colombian footballers
Association football defenders
Colombia international footballers
Atlético Huila footballers
Once Caldas footballers
Boyacá Chicó F.C. footballers
Millonarios F.C. players
Alianza Petrolera players
Categoría Primera A players
People from Huila Department